The Canton of Les Riceys is one of the 17 cantons of the Aube department, in northern France. Since the French canton reorganisation which came into effect in March 2015, the communes of the canton of Les Riceys are:

Arrelles
Assenay 
Avirey-Lingey
Avreuil 
Bagneux-la-Fosse
Balnot-la-Grange 
Balnot-sur-Laignes
Bernon
Les Bordes-Aumont 
Bouilly 
Bragelogne-Beauvoir
Channes 
Chaource
Chaserey
Chesley
Cormost
Coussegrey
Crésantignes
Cussangy
Étourvy
Fays-la-Chapelle
Les Granges
Javernant
Jeugny
Lagesse
Laines-aux-Bois
Lantages
Lignières
Lirey
La Loge-Pomblin
Les Loges-Margueron
Longeville-sur-Mogne
Machy
Maisons-lès-Chaource
Maupas
Metz-Robert 
Montceaux-lès-Vaudes
Pargues
Praslin
Prusy
Les Riceys
Roncenay
Saint-Jean-de-Bonneval
Saint-Pouange
Sommeval
Souligny
Turgy
Vallières
Vanlay
La Vendue-Mignot
Villemereuil
Villery
Villiers-le-Bois
Villiers-sous-Praslin
Villy-le-Bois
Villy-le-Maréchal
Vougrey

References

Cantons of Aube